Predecessor may refer to:

 A holy person announcing the approaching appearance of a prophet, see precursor
 Predecessor (graph theory), a term in graph theory
 The predecessor problem, a problem in theoretical computer science